Diaphania elegans is a moth in the family Crambidae. It was described by Heinrich Benno Möschler in 1890. It is found in Puerto Rico, Hispaniola, Jamaica, Cuba, Costa Rica, Panama, Guatemala, Honduras, Mexico and southern Texas. It is also found in South America, where it has been recorded from Venezuela, Trinidad, Ecuador, Peru, Brazil, Paraguay and Argentina.

The length of the forewings is 11–14 mm for males and 12.5–15 mm for females. There is a brown costal band, as well as an external brown band on the forewings. There is also a translucent white area, with a light purple gloss and with a group of yellow scales on the anal margin. The hindwings have an external brown band.

Larvae have been recorded feeding on the flowers of Cucurbita maxima.

References

Moths described in 1890
Diaphania